WGFY (1480 kHz) is a commercial AM radio station in Charlotte, North Carolina. The station is owned by the Charlotte Advent Media Corporation and it broadcasts a Christian talk and teaching radio format as a network affiliate of LifeTalk Radio.  WGFY carries hourly newscasts from the Salem Radio Network (SRN News).

On May 25, 2016, WGFY was granted a Federal Communications Commission construction permit to increase daytime power to 12,000 watts.  At night, it reduces power to 5,000 watts to avoid interfering with other stations on 1480 AM.  WGFY uses a directional antenna at all times.

History
On January 18, 1955, the station signed on with the call sign WWOK.  Initially a daytime only operation with 1,000 watts, the station added a directional antenna system and nighttime operation in the late 1950s.  The station was Charlotte's Mutual Broadcasting System network affiliate, and played middle of the road music.

In the 1960s, WWOK had switched to country music.  In 1969, the station was purchased by Mission Broadcasting of San Antonio, Texas, an early ancestor of  Clear Channel Communications.  Around this same time, Mission also purchased Miami R&B station WAME ("The Whammy in Miami").  The company flipped the call letters on its two acquisitions, sending WWOK to Florida and bringing WAME to Charlotte.

As WAME, the station was responsible for one of the first radio controversies in Charlotte, when the station's billboards showed a woman in tight jeans (and little else) having the WAME logo branded on her posterior.  Popular DJs in WAME's country music days included Ed Galloway, "Easy Edd" Robinson, "Large" Larry English, Bill Alexander, John Sutton and Bob Brandon.  On June 18, 1973, Bob Quay of WWVA (AM) became the new morning host, replacing Robinson, who moved to afternoons and also served as program manager, while Rich Jones returned to evenings and John Lyon returned to Charlotte from WWOK to do the overnight slot. The phrases "Whammy" and "Top Dog in Charlotte Country" were used extensively to promote the station in those days.

WAME became Charlotte's second full-time Christian radio station at 11 P.M. December 31, 1978 after Jimmy Swaggart's Sonlife Broadcasting bought the station. The format was mostly Contemporary Christian Music such as B.J. Thomas, Dave Boyer and Evie Tornquist. Jeff Flanders, an official for Swaggart, called it "a blend of music that would not offend anyone", and he said the objective was to get listeners who would not otherwise listen to Christian music. Galloway moved to WIST despite a noncompete clause. In early 1980, Swaggart denounced Contemporary Christian Music through his publication The Evangelist, and WAME changed to "teaching programs and middle-of-the-road, family-oriented music."  By 1980 half the programming was "spoken word". Popular DJs in WAME's Christian days were Danny Dyer, Teresa Gardner and Bob Harris. By 1985, WAME was, (despite the ownership's known objections to CCM) playing Contemporary Christian music again, and continued to do so until 1990. Popular DJ's during the era were Jon Hamilton, Larry Avant, Bill Howard, Dan Edwards, and Rob Truslow.

In March 1990, WAME was sold to a subsidiary of Pat Robertson's Christian Broadcasting Network, which changed the call letters to WCNT and began its own in-house syndicated talk network which included Harley David, Cliff Kincaid and Bob Kwessel. Following the demise of the network shows, WCNT became a primarily local talk radio station. Gerry Vaillancourt started his talk show on WCNT, and H. A. Thompson did a daily show on the station for several months.

During 1991, on Saturday and Sunday evenings, WCNT aired When Radio Was, hosted by Art Fleming, with radio serials such as The Shadow and Fibber McGee and Molly.
  
Late in 1991, WCNT began airing mostly sports talk. However, the station was never able to make a profit, with CBN taking the station dark at 9 AM on November 6, 1991, and searched for a buyer.

Early in 1993, new owners, the Christ Covenant Church of Matthews, North Carolina, returned the station to the air as WCNV ("Charlotte's News Voice"), airing the audio portion of CNN's Headline News Channel 24 hours a day.  As with its previous format, unprofitability and expenses forced the station silent by year's end.

In 1994, the owners of WHVN took over the station's operations under a local marketing agreement with Christ Covenant, and brought the station back on air as WIST with an adult standards format utilizing the "Stardust" format from Satellite Music Networks (later part of ABC Radio Networks). (The WIST callsign had been used in Charlotte from 1947 to 1983, last residing on what is now WHVN.) Talk shows and some sports programming were eventually added to the AM station after WIST added an FM frequency in 1995. John Sullivan was the most notable of the local hosts. Both the AM and FM stations began using the WNMX call letters in 1996.

In July 1997, WNMX, the current WAME in Statesville, and WAVO in Rock Hill, South Carolina formed the "Total Radio Network". WNMX became WTLT, and WAME became WTLI. The stations aired local and syndicated talk shows as well as news. But the format did not work, and WTLT returned to playing adult standards in November, starting with Christmas music during the holidays, while continuing to air syndicated hosts until their contracts ended. WTLT simulcast the Christian programming of WHVN beginning in early 1998 before Disney bought it and adopted the children's radio format of "Radio Disney" that fall, along with the current WGFY call letters that stood for Disney character Goofy.

On August 13, 2014, Disney put WGFY and twenty-two other Radio Disney stations up for sale, in order to focus more on digital distribution of the Radio Disney network. On January 26, 2015, Radio Disney Group filed to sell WGFY to the Charlotte Advent Media Corporation. Charlotte Advent Media bought the station for $600,000. The sale was consummated on May 5, 2015. On the same day, WGFY dropped Radio Disney programming and went silent. The station resumed operations on June 9.  It is an affiliate of the Seventh-Day Adventist-aligned Christian radio network LifeTalk Radio.

References

External links

GFY
Radio stations established in 1954
Former subsidiaries of The Walt Disney Company
GFY